An exchange rate regime is a way a monetary authority of a country or currency union manages the currency about other currencies and the foreign exchange market. It is closely related to monetary policy and the two are generally dependent on many of the same factors, such as economic scale and openness, inflation rate, the elasticity of the labor market, financial market development, capital mobility ,etc. 

There are two major regime types: 
 Floating (or flexible) exchange rate regime exist where exchange rates are determined solely by market forces and often manipulated by open-market operations. Countries do have the ability to influence their floating currency from activities such as buying/selling currency reserves, changing interest rates, and through foreign trade agreements. 
 Fixed (or pegged) exchange rate regimes, exist when a country sets the value of its home currency directly proportional to the value of another currency or commodity. For years many currencies were fixed (or pegged) to gold. If the value of gold rose, the value of the currency fixed to gold would also rise. Today, many currencies are fixed (pegged) to floating currencies from major nations. Many countries fixed their currency value to the U.S. Dollar, the Euro, or the British Pound.

There are also intermediate exchange rate regimes that combine elements of the other regimes. 

This classification of exchange rate regime is based on the classification method carried out by GGOW (Ghos, Guide, Ostry and Wolf, 1995, 1997), which combined the IMF de jure classification with the actual exchange behavior so as to differentiate between official and actual policies. The GGOW classification method is also called Trichotomy Method.

Fixed versus Floating

There are many factors a country should consider before deciding on a fixed or floating currency, with pros and cons to both choices. 

If a country chooses to fix its currency to the U.S. Dollar they achieve exchange rate stability. This means anytime they trade with the U.S. there will always be certainty on how their currency will be worth in terms of U.S. Dollars. Hong Kong pegged its currency to the U.S. dollar at a rate of approximately 8 to 1. Every 1 U.S. dollar will always be worth about 8 Hong Kong dollars unless they change their regime. Businesses love this certainty and pegging your currency can often lead to lots of foreign direct investment (FDI). Unfortunately, when a country decides to fix their currency they give up monetary autonomy. They are not able to set their own exchange rates and the strength/weakness of their currency is fully dependant on the currency they fixed itself to. 

If a country chooses to be free-floating, like the U.S. dollar, they are monetarily independent however they lose the exchange rate stability that fixed currencies have. Notice you can not achieve a that is monetarily independent yet also has an exchange rate stability. This inability to have both is part of a concept known as the incompatible trinity. When deciding upon a currency regime countries can achieve two out of three things. Full financial integration, exchange rate stability, or monetary independence. A country can never have a currency that achieves all three.

Exchange rate regimes

Floating exchange rate regime

A floating (or flexible) exchange rate regime is one in which a country's exchange rate fluctuates in a wider range and the country's monetary authority makes no attempt to fix it against any base currency. A movement in the exchange is either an appreciation or depreciation. 

Free float (Floating exchange rate)

Under a free float, also known as clean float, a currency's value is allowed to fluctuate in response to foreign-exchange market mechanisms without government intervention.

Managed float (or dirty float)

Under a managed float, also known as dirty float, a government may intervene in the market exchange rate in a variety of ways and degrees, in an attempt to make the exchange rate move in a direction conducive to the economic development of the country, especially during an extreme appreciation or depreciation. 

A monetary authority may, for example, allow the exchange rate to float freely between an upper and lower bound, a price "ceiling" and "floor".

Intermediate rate regime
The exchange rate regimes between the fixed ones and the floating ones.

Band (Target zone)

There is only a tiny variation around the fixed exchange rate against another currency, well within plus or minus 2%.

For example, Denmark has fixed its exchange rate against the euro, keeping it very close to 7.44 krone = 1 euro (0.134 euro = 1 krone).

Crawling peg

A crawling peg is when a currency steadily depreciates or appreciates at an almost constant rate against another currency, with the exchange rate following a simple trend.

Crawling band

Some variation about the rate is allowed, and adjusted as above.

For example, Colombia from 1996 to 2002, and Chile in the 1990s.

Currency basket peg

A currency basket is a portfolio of selected currencies with different weightings. The currency basket peg is commonly used to minimize the risk of currency fluctuations. For example, Kuwait shifted the peg based on a currency basket consists of currencies of its major trade and financial partners.

Fixed exchange rate regime

A fixed exchange rate regime, sometimes called a pegged exchange rate regime, is one in which a monetary authority pegs its currency's exchange rate to another currency, a basket of other currencies or to another measure of value (such as gold), and may allow the rate to fluctuate within a narrow range. To maintain the exchange rate within that range, a country's monetary authority usually needs to intervene in the foreign exchange market. A movement in the peg rate is called either revaluation or devaluation.

Currency board

Currency board is an exchange rate regime in which a country's exchange rate maintain a fixed exchange rate with a foreign currency, based on an explicit legislative commitment. It is a type of fixed regime that has special legal and procedural rules designed to make the peg "harder—that is, more durable". Examples include the Hong Kong dollar against the U.S dollar and Bulgarian lev against the Euro.

Dollarisation

Dollarisation, also currency substitution, means a country unilaterally adopts the currency of another country. 

Most of the adopting countries are too small to afford the cost of running its own central bank or issuing its own currency. Most of these economies use the U.S dollar, but other popular choices include the euro, and the Australian and New Zealand dollars.

Currency union

A currency union, also known as monetary union, is an exchange regime where two or more countries use the same currency. Under a currency union, there is some form of transnational structure such as a single central bank or monetary authority that is accountable to the member states.

Examples of currency unions are the Eurozone, CFA and CFP franc zones. One of the first known examples is the Latin Monetary Union that existed between 1865 and 1927. The Scandinavian Monetary Union existed between 1873 and 1905.

See also
 European Exchange Rate Mechanism

References

 Robert C. Feenstra, Alan M. Taylor, 2014, International Economics-Worth Publishers 
 Ye Shujun, 2009, International Economics,Tsinghua University Press,79
 Andrea, Inci, 2002, The Evolution of Exchange Rate Regimes Since 1990: Evidence from De Facto Policies, 8

Further reading
 Edwards, Sebastian & Levy Yeyati, Eduardo (2003) "Flexible Exchange Rates as Shock Absorbers," NBER Working Papers 9867, National Bureau of Economic Research, Inc..
 Kiguel, Andrea & Levy Yeyati, Eduardo (2009) "Back to 2007: Fear of appreciation in emerging economies".
 Tiwari, Rajnish (2003): Post-Crisis Exchange Rate Regimes in Southeast Asia, Seminar Paper, University of Hamburg. (PDF)
 Levy-Yeyati, Eduardo & Sturzenegger, Federico & Reggio, Iliana (2006) "On the Endogeneity of Exchange Rate Regimes," Working Paper Series rwp06-047, Harvard University, John F. Kennedy School of Government.
 Nenovsky. N, K. Dimitrova(2006). „Exchange Rate and Inflation: France and Bulgaria in the interwar period“.International Center for Economic Research Working Paper, Torino, No 34, 2006
 Nenovsky. N, G. Pavanelli and Dimitrova, K(2007). Rate Control in Italy and Bulgaria in the Interwar Period: History and Prospectives“''.International Center of Economic Research Working Paper,Torino, No 40, 2007
 Roberto Frenkel and Martín Rapetti, A Concise History of Exchange Rate Regimes in Latin America, Center for Economic and Policy Research, April 2010
 Coudert, Virginie and Cécile Couharde, Currency Misalignments and Exchange Rate Regimes in Emerging and Developing Countries. , 2008.

Foreign exchange market